GEK may refer to:

 EKO Cobra, an Austrian counter-terrorism unit
 GEK Terna, a Greek conglomerate
 Gradient-enhanced kriging
 Yiwom language